I Fall Down may refer to:

"I Fall Down", song by Cyndi Lauper (see List of songs recorded by Cyndi Lauper)
"I Fall Down", 1997 song by John Davis (singer-songwriter) from 30 Amp Fuse
"I Fall Down", 2012 song by Sahaj from Another Minute
"I Fall Down" (U2 song), 1981 song by U2
 I Fall Down, 2013 dramatic horror film written and directed by  Christopher White